Samantha Armytage (born 4 September 1976) is an Australian journalist and television presenter.

Armytage was previously co-host of the Seven Network's breakfast television program Sunrise from 2013 to 2021 alongside David Koch. She also previously co-hosted Weekend Sunrise and presented Seven's 4.30 News.

Early life 
Armytage was born to Mac and Elizabeth Armytage. She grew up on Bolaro Station, a sheep property near Adaminaby in New South Wales, where her father was the station manager. Armytage is a direct descendant of George Armytage, a pioneer British settler in Australia who was involved in an attack on local Aboriginal people. She has a younger brother, Charlie.

She attended boarding school at Kincoppal-Rose Bay in Sydney starting from Year Nine and then studied at Charles Sturt University.

Career
Armytage began her media career at WIN Television in Canberra in 1999, as a news reporter and presenter in Canberra. Following this she joined Sky News Australia in 2002 where she was chief political reporter.

Seven Network 
In 2003, Armytage joined the Seven Network after being noticed by the network executives while covering the 2003 Canberra Bushfires.

In December 2004, Armytage landed her first major presenting role, filling-in as presenter on Seven News Sydney over the Summer non-ratings period. Following the non-ratings period she had stints presenting Seven Morning News, the national late news updates, and filling in as presenter of Seven News Sydney. Throughout 2005 and 2006, Armytage was a regular fill-in presenter for Chris Bath on Seven News Sydney.

In October 2006, Armytage replaced Mike Amor as presenter of Seven 4.30 News. She had replaced Rebecca Maddern as presenter when the network moved production from Melbourne to Sydney.

In 2011, Armytage was a contestant on Dancing With The Stars and continued to file reports for Sunday Night, while also being a regular fill-in presenter on Sunrise, Today Tonight and The Morning Show.

In 2014, Armytage presented the makeover reality show Bringing Sexy Back, which was cancelled after one season due to low ratings.

In October 2021, the Seven Network announced that Armytage will take part in Seven's race day coverage and appear as a special guest on the reality show The Farmer Wants a Wife when it returns in 2022.

In February 2023, the Seven Network announced that Armytage will host the new season of The Farmer Wants a Wife.

Sunrise and Weekend Sunrise 
In June 2007, Armytage was appointed co-host of Weekend Sunrise alongside Andrew O'Keefe, replacing Lisa Wilkinson who moved to Today on the Nine Network.

In June 2013, Armytage was announced as the replacement for Sunrise co-host Melissa Doyle; she began her position that September.

On 8 March 2021, Armytage announced her resignation from Sunrise, to spend more time with her family. Her final show was on 11 March 2021.

Other 
In 2017, Armytage joined News Corp Australia lifestyle magazine Stellar as a columnist.

In collaboration with Stellar, Armytage launched her own podcast called Something to Talk About with Samantha Armytage on 28 February 2021.

Controversies

In March 2015, Armytage was accused of racism in an on-air interview, after congratulating a woman for looking whiter than her twin. After an online petition was signed by over 2,000 people calling for her to apologise, she did so.

In February 2016, a Sex and The City themed skit on Sunrise with actress Kristen Davis backfired on Armytage. Davis had appeared on the show to discuss her work with the United Nations High Commissioner for Refugees, but later on Twitter expressed her annoyance that Sunrise focused on her role in Sex and The City. After the incident, Armytage, who was meant to MC and conduct an interview with Davis at a UN event in Sydney, was asked not to host or attend the event.

In March 2018, Armytage hosted a segment on Sunrise focusing on Aboriginal adoption, during which she incorrectly claimed that Aboriginal children could not be fostered by White people and stated that "Post-Stolen Generation, there's been a huge move to leave Aboriginal children where they are, even if they're being neglected in their own families." Protests were held outside the Sunrise studio in Martin Place in response to the segment. In September 2018, the Australian Communications and Media Authority ruled that the segment had breached the Commercial Television Industry Code of Practice, as it contained inaccurate statements and "strong negative generalisations about Indigenous people as a group". In June 2020, Armytage was sued for racial vilification over the segment.

Personal life
In June 2020, Armytage announced her engagement to partner, Richard Lavender. The two got married in a private ceremony in the Southern Highlands on 31 December 2020. Armytage became a stepmother to Lavender's two daughters from his previous marriage.

References

Sources
Funny side of life for popular TV host, smh.com.au 
Russell Crowe and Samantha Armytage flirt their way through Channel 7 set, dailytelegraph.com.au 
Lessons of television breakfast chemistry, news.com.au
"Fitzy and Wippa's 'naked prank' on Sunrise host Samantha Armytage slammed as 'offensive'", couriermail.com.au

External links

 
 
 

1976 births
Australian television journalists
Seven News presenters
Charles Sturt University alumni
Living people
People educated at Kincoppal School